The Animal Wall is a sculptured wall depicting 15 animals in the Castle Quarter of the city centre of Cardiff, Wales. It stands to the west of the entrance to Cardiff Castle, having been moved from its original position in front of the castle in the early 1930s. The design for the wall was conceived by William Burges, architect to the third Marquess of Bute, during Burges's reconstruction of the castle in the 1860s, but it was not executed until the late 1880s/early 1890s. This work, which included the original nine animal sculptures, all undertaken by Burges's favourite sculptor, Thomas Nicholls, was carried out under the direction of William Frame, who had previously assisted Burges at both Cardiff Castle and at Castell Coch. When the wall was moved in the early 20th century, the fourth Marquess commissioned Alexander Carrick to carve a further six sculptures to sit on the extended wall which now fronted Bute Park. The Animal Wall is a Grade I listed structure.

History and description
John Crichton-Stuart succeeded to the marquessate of Bute in 1848 at the age of six months, on the death of his father. By his 21st birthday, he had converted to Catholicism and come into an inheritance that reputedly made him "the richest man in the world". A significant part of his patrimony included estates in South Wales, brought into the Bute family by his great-grandfather's marriage to Charlotte Windsor, heiress to Herbert Windsor, 2nd Viscount Windsor. The estates centred on Cardiff Castle, a building the marquess despised; "I am painfully alive to the fact that the castle is very far indeed from setting anything like an example in art". In 1865, he met William Burges. This may have resulted from Burges’ father's engineering firm, Walker, Burges and Cooper, having undertaken work on the East Bute Docks in Cardiff for the second Marquess. Bute and Burges established a partnership of patron and architect which lasted until Burges' death in 1881 and saw them transform both Cardiff Castle, and the ruins of another castle, north of Cardiff, Castell Coch. The architectural writer Michael Hall considers these buildings to be Burges' best, "amongst the most magnificent the Gothic Revival ever achieved".

The Animal Wall was designed by Burges in 1866, but it was not built until 1890, after Burges' death in 1881. Burges had originally planned a Pre-Raphaelite garden to be constructed in the moat in front of the castle, and flowerbeds were laid out, those against the castle walls being planted with grape vines. The two lowest storeys of the Clock Tower were to provide accommodation for a gardener and gave access directly into the moat. Joseph Mordaunt Crook, the foremost authority on Burges, considers that the garden, had it been completed, "might have been one of Burges's happiest devices [and] unique: a municipal Pre-Raphaelite garden". The wall on the street side of the garden was complete by 1885, but the carving of the animals was not undertaken until the late 1880s. Work on the castle and the building of the Animal Wall was undertaken by Burges' assistant William Frame. The original nine animal figures were sculptured by Thomas Nicholls, Burges' favourite sculptor, and included a hyena, a wolf, two baboons, a seal, a bear, a lioness, a lynx and two lions.

In 1931 a further six sculptures were added; the pelican, an ant-eater, two raccoons, a leopard, a beaver and a vulture. They were sculpted by Alexander Carrick. The animals featured in a 1930s cartoon strip, authored by Dorothy Howard Rowlands, which ran in the South Wales Echo. In the 1970s city council planners planned to demolish the Animal Wall to further widen Castle Street but the idea was later abandoned.

The animals were originally painted in naturalistic colours, although this paintwork deteriorated rapidly, and was subsequently removed. As part of a £5.6 million refurbishment of Bute Park, restoration of the animals began in July 2010. During the repair, the anteater's nose, which has been missing since the late 90s, was replaced as well as the missing glass eyes in the nine original animals. This work was completed in October 2010. The Animal Wall is a Grade I listed structure.

Gallery

Figures sculptured by Thomas Nicholls in 1891

Figures sculptured by Alexander Carrick in 1931

See also
Grade I listed buildings in Cardiff

Notes

References

Sources

External links

Landmarks in Cardiff
Grade I listed walls
Grade I listed buildings in Cardiff
Outdoor sculptures in Wales
Animals in art
1890 sculptures
Arts in Cardiff
Sculptures of birds
Sculptures of lions
Sculptures of bears
Wolves in art
Castle, Cardiff